City of Love may refer to:

 Paris, as a nickname
 Venice, as a nickname
 Iloilo City, as a nickname
 San Francisco, as a nickname
 City of Love (album), a 2020 album by Deacon Blue
 The City of Love, a 2007 novel by Rimi B. Chatterjee
 City of Love: Paris, a 2016 videogame produced by Ubisoft.

See also
Season of the Witch: Enchantment, Terror, and Deliverance in the City of Love, a 2012 book by David Talbot